Caryl Neuenschwander (born January 16, 1984) is a Swiss professional ice hockey player. He is currently playing for the Lausanne Hockey Club of Switzerland's National League A.

References

External links

1984 births
Living people
SC Bern players
Swiss ice hockey right wingers
Lausanne HC players